Epacris sprengelioides is a species of flowering plant in the family Ericaceae and is endemic to a small area in the Blue Mountains in New South Wales. It is an erect shrub with shaggy-hairy branchlets, more or less erect, narrowly elliptic leaves, and white or cream-coloured, tube-shaped flowers.

Description
The leaves are relatively thin, concave on the upper surface and have a rounded tip.

Taxonomy
This species was first formally described in 1899 by Joseph Maiden and Ernst Betche who gave it the name Rupicola sprengelioides in the Proceedings of the Linnean Society of New South Wales, from specimens collected in 1898 at the southern edge of the Kings Tableland in the Blue Mountains. In 2015, Elizabeth Brown changed the name to Epacris sprengelioides in Australian Systematic Botany.

Distribution and habitat
Epacris sprengelioides grows on sandstone ledges, cliff faces and rocky ground in the Burragorang Valley section of the Blue Mountains in eastern New South Wales.

References

sprengelioides
Ericales of Australia
Flora of New South Wales
Taxa named by Joseph Maiden
Taxa named by Ernst Betche
Plants described in 1899